Wacton may refer to:
Wacton, Herefordshire, England
Wacton, Norfolk, England